Mississauga Goddam is a 2004 album by The Hidden Cameras.

The title is an allusion to Nina Simone's civil rights anthem "Mississippi Goddam" (from the album Nina Simone in Concert), suggesting suburbia (Mississauga is a suburb of Toronto) as the real battleground for LGBT equality.

The album was released on Rough Trade Records in the United Kingdom and EvilEvil in Canada.

A video for the title "I Believe in the Good of Life", was released. Directed by Joel Gibb, starred band members Joel Gibb, Maggie MacDonald, Mike e.b., Lex Vaughn, Owen Pallett, and others, along with guest stars Tawny LeSabre, Keith Cole, Will Munro, and G.B. Jones.

Track listing
 "Doot Doot Plot" – 2:47
 "Builds the Bone" – 3:40
 "The Fear Is On" – 2:41
 "That's When the Ceremony Starts" – 3:07
 "I Believe in the Good of Life" – 3:33
 "In the Union of Wine" – 4:43
 "Music Is My Boyfriend" – 3:28
 "Bboy" – 2:38
 "We Oh We" – 4:32
 "I Want Another Enema" – 3:55
 "Mississauga Goddam" – 5:44

Personnel
Joel Gibb - Producer, vocals, guitar, drums, bass, glockenspiel, piano, tambourine, organ, kazoo, vibraphone, synthesizer, steel drum, aeuwwgha, artwork, photos
Ohad Benchetrit - flute
Mike e.b. - tambourine
Jameson Elliot - assistant engineer
Scott Good - trombone
Luis Jacob - aeuwwgha
Nana Jojura - violin
Don Kerr - cello
Amy Laing - cello
Jeff McMurrich - recording engineer
Maggie MacDonald - glockenspiel, vibraphone
Paul Mathew - double bass
Karen Moffat - viola
Lief Mosbaugh - viola
Kristen Moss - harp
Mike Olson - cello
Owen Pallett - violin, piano, celeste
Matais Rozenberg - spoons, percussion, drums, bass keys
Jennifer Scofield - French horn
Phil Seguin - trumpet
Justin Shayshyn - B4 Hammond organ, pipe organ
Lex Vaughn - maraca drums, timpani, drums
Choir - Caroline Azar, Amy Bowles, Kate McGee, Glen Sheppard, Megan Dunlop, Tom Lillington, Michael Follert, Reg Vermue

References 

2004 albums
The Hidden Cameras albums
Rough Trade Records albums